Ronald Regnor Biilmann (16 May 1908 – 16 May 1963) was a rugby union player who represented Australia.

Biilmann, a fly-half, was born in Berridale, New South Wales and claimed a total of 4 international rugby caps for Australia.

References

Australian rugby union players
Australia international rugby union players
1908 births
1963 deaths
Rugby union players from New South Wales
Rugby union fly-halves